Syria competed at the 2012 Summer Paralympics in London, United Kingdom from August 29 to September 9, 2012.

Athletics 

Men’s Field Events

Powerlifting 

Men

Women

See also

 Syria at the 2012 Summer Olympics

References

Nations at the 2012 Summer Paralympics
2012
2012 in Syrian sport